Sir George Raymond Hinchcliffe (2 March 1900 – 6 September 1973) was a British barrister and was a High Court judge from 1957 to 1973. He was appointed KC in 1947. He was knighted on 1 February 1957.

Marriage
He married golfing pioneer Poppy Wingate (1902–1977) on 10 May 1940, and had two step-children.

References

External links 

 

Knights Bachelor
Queen's Bench Division judges
English King's Counsel
Royal Air Force officers
Members of the Middle Temple
Alumni of Trinity Hall, Cambridge
1900 births
1973 deaths
20th-century King's Counsel